The Eastern Africa Submarine Cable System (EASSy) is an undersea fibre optic cable system connecting countries in Eastern Africa to the rest of the world.

EASSy runs from Mtunzini in South Africa to Port Sudan in Sudan, with landing points in nine countries and is connected to at least ten landlocked countries — which will no longer have to rely on satellite Internet access to carry voice and data services.

EASSy was the highest capacity system serving sub-Saharan Africa until the commissioning of WACS. It has a 2 fibre-pair configuration with a design capacity of more than 10 terabit per second (Tbit/s). It is the first to deliver direct connectivity between east Africa and Europe / North America. It is  the only system with built-in resilience end-to-end. EASSy interconnects with multiple international submarine cable networks for onward connectivity to Europe, the Americas, the Middle East and Asia.

The project, partially funded by the World Bank, was initiated in January 2003, when a handful of companies investigated its feasibility. The cable entered service on 16 July 2010, with commercial service starting on 30 July 2010.

Project milestones
MoU signature – December 2003
Detailed feasibility study – March 2004
Data gathering meeting – June 2005
C&MA drafting finalization – March 2006
Supply contract award – September 2006
Registration/incorporation of SPV – January 2007
Construction and maintenance agreement (Shareholders' Agreement) Signature (C&MA) – 12 October 2006 to 12 February 2007
Financial closure – March 2007
Supply contract signature – March 2007
Construction Started – March 2008
Cable manufacture complete – November 2009
Marine laying commencing – December 2009
Construction complete – April 2010
Live – July 2010

Telecommunications companies of participating nations
West Indian Ocean Cable Company WIOCC comprising:
 Botswana Fibre Networks (BOFINET)
 DALKOM Somalia
 Djibouti Telecom
 Gilat Satcom Nigeria
 Seychelles Cable System
 Lesotho Communications Authority
 Onatel Burundi
 TMCEL Mozambique
 Telkom Kenya
 Libyan Post Telecommunications & Information Technology Company (LPTIC)
 Liquid Telecom
 Uganda Telecom Limited
 Zantel Tanzania
 TelOne Zimbabwe
MTN Group
Sudatel Sudan
Vodacom
Telkom South Africa
Botswana Telecommunications Corporation
BT Group
Global Marine Systems
Comores Cables
Telma Madagascar
Etisalat
FT
Mauritius Telecom
STC Saudi Arabia
Bharti Airtel
Liquid Telecom
Tanzania Telecommunications Company Limited

Cable landing points
The cable landing points are:
 Port Sudan, Sudan
 Djibouti
 Mogadishu, Somalia
 Mombasa, Kenya
 Moroni, Comoros
 Dar es Salaam, Tanzania
 Toliary, Madagascar
 Maputo,  Mozambique
 Mtunzini, South Africa

See also
 ACE
 LION
 Main One
 SAT-2
 SAT-3/WASC
 SAFE
 SEACOM
 TEAMS
 WACS
 BRICS
 Australia West Express (AWE)

References

"Eastern Africa submarine cable delayed for one year", Sudan Tribune,  February 4, 2006
"Kenya: Govt Gives Ultimatum for Cable Project", The East African Standard, May 17, 2006
"Africa Resolves Telecommunications Debate Over EASSy Project", Infoworld, June 12, 2006
"Alcatel Wins EASSy Contract", IT Web, July 12, 2006
 "Kenya aims for own internet cable", BBC News, September 8, 2006

External links
EASSy official website
WIOCC - largest EASSy investor
A presentation on EASSy by E. Yonazi, East African Community Secretariat

East Africa
Southern Africa
Internet in Africa
Submarine communications cables in the Indian Ocean
Wide area networks
2010 establishments in Africa